Adrian Rakowski (born 7 October 1990) is a Polish professional footballer who plays as a midfielder.

Career

Club
He made his debut for Zagłębie in a 3–1 victory to Lechia Gdańsk on 27 November 2010.

On 6 October 2020, he signed with third-tier II liga club Chojniczanka Chojnice.

References

External links 
 
 

1990 births
People from Żagań
Sportspeople from Lubusz Voivodeship
Living people
Polish footballers
Association football midfielders
Zagłębie Lubin players
Olimpia Grudziądz players
Podbeskidzie Bielsko-Biała players
Chojniczanka Chojnice players
Ekstraklasa players
I liga players
II liga players
III liga players